Rickey Green (born August 18, 1954) is an American retired professional basketball player who played in the National Basketball Association (NBA).

He then played college basketball at Vincennes University and the University of Michigan; at the latter school, his team lost to the undefeated Big Ten Conference rival Indiana Hoosiers in the championship game of the 1976 NCAA tournament. He then led the 1976–77 Wolverines to the Big Ten regular season championship, earning 1977 All-American recognition.

Green was selected with the 16th pick in the 1977 NBA draft, and competed in 14 seasons, playing for the Golden State Warriors, Detroit Pistons, Utah Jazz, Charlotte Hornets, Milwaukee Bucks, Indiana Pacers, Philadelphia 76ers, and Boston Celtics.  He was known for his speed, nicknamed "The Fastest of Them All" by announcer Hot Rod Hundley.

In 1988, as a member of the Jazz, Green scored the five millionth point in NBA history, hitting a 3-pointer at the buzzer to end the third quarter in a game against the Cleveland Cavaliers.  He autographed the ball after the game and it was taken to the NBA Hall of Fame.

Professional career
Green spent his rookie year with the Warriors as a backup, and was traded to the Pistons just prior to the 1978–79 season.  He played in 27 games for coach Dick Vitale in Detroit before being released in December 1978.  Out of the NBA, Green ultimately found himself playing for the Hawaii Volcanos in the Continental Basketball Association.  There, he was able to transform his game, from being a shoot-first point guard to more of a distributor and floor general on offense.

He returned to the NBA in 1980, having caught the eye of Jazz coach and general manager Frank Layden.  Green played significant minutes at the point guard position in his first year, teaming with high-scoring small forward Adrian Dantley and rookie shooting guard Darrell Griffith.  He established himself as undisputed full-time starter in the 1981–82 season, averaging a career-high 14.8 points per game, and ranking among league leaders in assists (7.8) and steals (2.3) per game.  He continued his strong scoring the following year, averaging 14.3 points per game, and improved in assists (8.9) and steals (2.8), ranking third and second, respectively, among league leaders in those categories.

The following season (1983–84) was probably Green's best as a professional.  He continued his strong play on offense, averaging 13.2 points and a career-high 9.2 assists per game.  In addition, he led the NBA in steals per game (2.7) and total steals (215); of note, he had also led the league in total steals the year previous year (with 220).  For his efforts, he was named to the 1984 NBA All-Star Game, the only All-Star appearance of his career.  Even more importantly, after a decade of struggling as a franchise, the Jazz won the Midwest Division title and earned their first-ever appearance in the NBA playoffs, advancing to the conference semifinals before losing to the Phoenix Suns.

Green remained the starting point guard for Utah for most of the next three seasons, leading the team into the playoffs each year, but was increasing challenged for playing time by a young new arrival named John Stockton, whom the Jazz had selected in the 1984 NBA Draft.  Stockton ultimately overtook Green as starter in 1987, and went on to a Hall of Fame career that totaled 19 seasons in the league, all with the Jazz franchise.  Green was chosen by the Charlotte Hornets in the expansion draft in 1988, and ended up playing for five different teams in the last four years of his career, mostly as a backup.  He experienced a brief resurgence with the 76ers in 1990–91 after Johnny Dawkins suffered a season-ending injury; Green started 75 games in his place that year, averaging 10.0 points and 5.2 assists per game.  He retired in 1992 after a brief stint with the Celtics.

NBA career statistics

Regular season

|-
| style="text-align:left;"| 
| style="text-align:left;"|Golden State
| 76 || – || 14.4 || .381 || – || .600 || 1.5 || 2.0 || 0.8 || 0.0 || 4.5
|-
| style="text-align:left;"| 
| style="text-align:left;"|Detroit
| 27 || – || 16.0 || .379 || – || .672 || 1.5 || 2.3 || 0.9 || 0.0 || 6.6
|-
| style="text-align:left;"| 
| style="text-align:left;"|Utah
| 47 || – || 27.8 || .481 || .000 || .722 || 2.5 || 5.0 || 1.6 || 0.0 || 9.0
|-
| style="text-align:left;"| 
| style="text-align:left;"|Utah
| 81 || 73 || 34.8 || .493 || .000 || .765 || 3.0 || 7.8 || 2.3 || 0.1 || 14.8
|-
| style="text-align:left;"| 
| style="text-align:left;"|Utah
| 78 || 78 || 35.7 || .493 || .154 || .797 || 2.9 || 8.9 || 2.8 || 0.1 || 14.3
|-
| style="text-align:left;"| 
| style="text-align:left;"|Utah
| 81 || 81 || 34.2 || .486 || .118 || .821 || 2.8 || 9.2 ||style="background:#cfecec;"| 2.7* || 0.2 || 13.2
|-
| style="text-align:left;"| 
| style="text-align:left;"|Utah
| 77 || 77 || 31.6 || .477 || .300 || .869 || 2.5 || 7.8 || 1.7 || 0.0 || 13.0
|-
| style="text-align:left;"| 
| style="text-align:left;"|Utah
| 80 || 44 || 25.2 || .471 || .172 || .852 || 1.7 || 5.1 || 1.3 || 0.1 || 11.7
|-
| style="text-align:left;"| 
| style="text-align:left;"|Utah
| 81 || 80 || 25.8 || .467 || .368 || .827 || 2.0 || 6.7 || 1.4 || 0.0 || 9.6
|-
| style="text-align:left;"| 
| style="text-align:left;"|Utah
| 81 || 3 || 13.8 || .424 || .211 || .904 || 1.0 || 3.7 || 0.7 || 0.0 || 4.9
|-
| style="text-align:left;"| 
| style="text-align:left;"|Charlotte
| 33 || 2 || 11.2 || .432 || .200 || .929 || 0.7 || 2.5 || 0.5 || 0.0 || 3.9
|-
| style="text-align:left;"| 
| style="text-align:left;"|Milwaukee
| 30 || 0 || 16.7 || .545 || .333 || .895 || 1.5 || 3.5 || 0.7 || 0.1 || 5.4
|-
| style="text-align:left;"| 
| style="text-align:left;"|Indiana
| 69 || 0 || 13.4 || .433 || .091 || .843 || 0.8 || 2.6 || 0.7 || 0.0 || 3.5
|-
| style="text-align:left;"| 
| style="text-align:left;"|Philadelphia
| 79 || 75 || 28.5 || .463 || .222 || .830 || 1.7 || 5.2 || 0.7 || 0.1 || 10.0
|-
| style="text-align:left;"| 
| style="text-align:left;"|Boston
| 26 || 0 || 14.1 || .447 || .250 || .722 || 0.9 || 2.6 || 0.7 || 0.0 || 4.1
|- class="sortbottom"
| style="text-align:center;" colspan="2"| Career
| 946 || 513 || 24.6 || .469 || .207 || .807 || 1.9 || 5.5 || 1.4 || 0.1 || 9.4
|- class="sortbottom"
| style="text-align:center;" colspan="2"| All-Star
| 1 || 0 || 19.0 || .375 || – || – || 0.0 || 11.0 || 1.0 || 0.0 || 6.0

Playoffs

|-
|style="text-align:left;"|1984
|style="text-align:left;”|Utah
|11||–||36.7||.424||.250||.744||3.1||9.5||1.7||0.4||14.6
|-
|style="text-align:left;"|1985
|style="text-align:left;”|Utah
|10||10||30.2||.538||.143||.921||3.0||7.5||1.2||0.0||15.0
|-
|style="text-align:left;"|1986
|style="text-align:left;”|Utah
|4||4||29.8||.488||.500||.909||2.3||9.5||0.5||0.0||13.3
|-
|style="text-align:left;"|1987
|style="text-align:left;”|Utah
|4||3||18.0||.478||.000||.833||2.0||6.3||0.5||0.0||6.8
|-
|style="text-align:left;"|1988
|style="text-align:left;”|Utah
|7||0||5.4||.250||–||–||0.1||1.3||0.3||0.0||0.6
|-
|style="text-align:left;"|1989
|style="text-align:left;”|Milwaukee
|8||0||13.8||.414||.500||1.000||1.6||2.3||0.6||0.0||3.6
|-
|style="text-align:left;"|1990
|style="text-align:left;”|Indiana
|3||0||10.3||.143||–||–||0.3||1.0||0.3||0.0||0.7
|-
|style="text-align:left;"|1991
|style="text-align:left;”|Philadelphia
|8||8||24.9||.436||.750||.889||1.1||2.8||0.9||0.0||7.4
|- class="sortbottom"
| style="text-align:center;" colspan="2"| Career
| 55 || 25 || 23.2 || .455 || .350 || .847 || 1.9 || 5.3 || 0.9 || 0.1 || 8.8

See also
 List of National Basketball Association players with most steals in a game
 University of Michigan Athletic Hall of Honor

Notes

External links

1954 births
Living people
African-American basketball players
All-American college men's basketball players
American men's basketball players
Basketball players from Chicago
Billings Volcanos players
Boston Celtics players
Charlotte Hornets expansion draft picks
Charlotte Hornets players
Detroit Pistons players
Golden State Warriors draft picks
Golden State Warriors players
Hawaii Volcanos players
Indiana Pacers players
Michigan Wolverines men's basketball players
Milwaukee Bucks players
National Basketball Association All-Stars
Philadelphia 76ers players
Point guards
Utah Jazz players
Vincennes Trailblazers men's basketball players
21st-century African-American people
20th-century African-American sportspeople